The women's road race B cycling event at the 2016 Summer Paralympics took place on September 17 at Pontal, Rio. The race distance was 60 km.

Results : Women's road race B

References

Women's road race B